Mahmudabad (also Romanized as Maḩmūdābād and Mahmood Abad) is a village in Baqeran Rural District, in the Central District of Birjand County, South Khorasan Province, Iran. At the 2006 census, its population was 146, in 46 families.

References 

Populated places in Birjand County